Roylea is a genus of flowering plant in the family Lamiaceae, first described as a genus in 1830. It contains only one known species, Roylea cinerea, native to the Western Himalayas of Nepal and northern India.

References

Lamiaceae
Flora of Nepal
Flora of West Himalaya
Monotypic Lamiaceae genera
Taxa named by David Don
Taxa named by Henri Ernest Baillon